Tiaro Railway Station is a closed railway station on the North Coast railway line in Queensland, Australia.

History

The station was built in 1877, two years before the line from Gympie to Maryborough was completed. It consisted of a station building and a platform, and two sidings running parallel to the main North Coast line. After the station closed, the building was moved to Mayne Street and restored as a tourist information centre. Some of the siding platforms still exist, however the station platform has been removed.

References

Disused railway stations in Queensland
North Coast railway line, Queensland
Railway stations in Australia opened in 1887